Tsolak Vaghinag Bekaryan (October 30, 1922 – August 22, 1980) was an Armenian composer, violinist, and pedagogue. He was born in Addis Ababa, Ethiopia to educators, Vaghinag and Mari Bekaryan. In 1926, Bekaryan, with his parents, returned to their motherland, Armenia. Bekaryan has written orchestral, instrumental, and vocal compositions. He died in the town of Sortavala in the Republic of Karelia, Russia (his holiday home).

Biography 
 From 1940 to 1942, Bekaryan studied at the State Music College named after Romanos Melikyan
 In 1948, Bekaryan graduated from Komitas State Conservatory of Yerevan from the violin department. In 1960, from the composition department with the guidance of Edvard Mirzoyan.
 During 1945 to 1965, he performed with the Armenian Philharmonic Orchestra
 From 1965 to 1980, Bekaryan taught at Armenian State Pedagogical University

Compositions 

 Concerto - string Orchestra
 Rhapsody - Symphony Orchestra
 Suite - folk ensemble
 Festive Overture - violin ensemble and piano
 Characters - piano quintet
 Concerto - for the violin accompanied by the piano 
 Poem - for the violin accompanied by the piano
 Suite - for the piano and flute
 Sonata No. 1 - violin solo
 Sonata No. 3 - violin solo
 Fantastic Prelude - piano
 Freedom Song - cantata vocal-symphonic poem
 Alagyaz Mani - cantata reciter, choir, and Symphony Orchestra
 My Luck - voice and chamber orchestra
 Striptease - among the songs of 20th Century Paris
 Parvana - Women's Choir and Chamber Orchestra poem
 Ave Maria - mixed choir poem
 Song of Freedom - for a cantata reciter and mixed choir without accompaniment
 Marine Monastery - for a mixed choir without any accompaniment
 Symphony No. 1 - for a mixed choir without any accompaniment
 Symphony No. 2 - for a mixed choir without any accompaniment

Publications 
 Poem for the violin accompanied by the piano, 1971, Yerevan
 Two sonatas for violin solos, 1973, Yerevan 
 Оркестровые произведения советских композиторов, Поэма для струнного оркестра, 1976, Moscow
 Романсы композиторов Армении, Моему счастью, 1976, Moscow
 Armenian Composers' Vocal Works, Marine Monastery, 1978, Yerevan 
 Ts. Bekaryan, Y. Gevorgyan, solfeggio, 1980, Yerevan
 Violin sonatas, Sonata No. 3, 1983, Yerevan

Vinyl Records 
 Violin music. Plays Ruben Aharonyan Tsolak Bekaryan - Sonata No.2 for violin solo. (LP, RP) Melodiya С10 04661 009, 1982
 Choir of the Armenian Choral Society. Conductor Emma Tsaturyan:  Tsolak Bekaryan - "Mariné Vancum". Melodiya
 Romances on the lyrics of A. Isahakyan. Melodiya
 Tsolak Bekaryan - "To my destinyz" - Knarik Maluntsyan. Melodiya

References 

1922 births
1980 deaths
Armenian composers
Armenian violinists
People from Addis Ababa
Ethiopian people of Armenian descent
20th-century violinists
Ethiopian emigrants to the Soviet Union
Soviet composers
Soviet violinists